Charles Atwood Kofoid (11 October 1865 – 30 May 1947) was an American zoologist known for his collection and classification of many new species of marine protozoans which established marine biology on a systematic basis.

Kofoid also wrote a volume on the biological stations of Europe.

In 1920, Kofoid and US zoologist Olive Swezy (1873-1968), published Pavillardia  (a genus of dinoflagellates) in Univ. Calif. Publ. Zool. pages 323-324. It was named in honour of Jules Pavillard. 

In 1921, Kofoid and Olive Swezy, wrote a book about unarmored dinoflagellates in La Jolla, California, in which they described a new genus called Torodinium (with Torodinium robustum and the type species Torodinium teredo). They also published Gyrodinium, which is a genus of dinoflagellates belonging to the order Gymnodiniales in 'Memoirs of the University of California'. vol.5.

In 1929, botanist Pavillard first described Kofoidinium, which is a genus of dinoflagellates belonging to the family Kofoidiniaceae.

References

Other sources

External links 
Kofoid, Charles A. (Charles Atwood) Papers at The Bancroft Library
Charles Atwood Kofoid Papers, SMC 24. Special Collections & Archives, UC San Diego Library.
National Academy of Sciences Biographical Memoir
 Critical biography of Kofoid "The good, the bad, and the ugly" published in the European Journal of Protistology

1865 births
1947 deaths
American zoologists
American marine biologists
Harvard University alumni
Presidents of the American Society of Parasitologists